Evanor João Fantin, simply known as Evanor (Chinese: 伊雲羅 Evanor, born March 16, 1974) is a Brazilian footballer who currently plays as a defensive midfielder for Eastern in the Hong Kong First Division.

Honours
With Happy Valley:
Hong Kong First Division League: 2005-06

Career statistics

Happy Valley Career Statistics
As of August 3, 2006

Notes and references

External links
Evanor at HKFA

1974 births
Brazilian footballers
Brazilian expatriate footballers
Eastern Sports Club footballers
Expatriate footballers in Hong Kong
Association football midfielders
Happy Valley AA players
Hong Kong First Division League players
Living people
Brazilian expatriate sportspeople in Hong Kong